Kyzyltu, sometimes spelled Qyzyltu (Qyzyltu) is a village in Almaty Region of south-eastern Kazakhstan.

References

Populated places in Almaty Region